This is a list of archives in Israel.

Archives in Israel 

 Abba Hushi Archive, Younes & Soraya Nazarian Library, University of Haifa
 Bet Aaronsohn and NILI Museum
 Beit Theresienstadt
 Central Zionist Archives
 Ghetto Fighters' House
 Haganah Historical Archive, Israel Ministry of Defense
 Information Center for Israeli Art
 Israel Architecture Archive
 IDF and Security Forces Archives, Israel Ministry of Defense
 Israel Folktale Archives, Humanities Faculty, University of Haifa
 Israel State Archive
 Jabotinsky Institute in Israel
 Jerusalem Cinematheque
 Jewish National Fund Photo Archive, KKL-JNF
 Kiddush Hashem Archive
 Liebermann House, Nahariya
 Massuah Institute for Holocaust Studies
 Moreshet Archive, Mordechai Anielevich Memorial Holocaust Study and Research Center, Givat Haviva, Kibbutz Artzi
 National Photo Collection, Israel Government Press Office
 "Phonotheque" National Sound Archives, National Library of Israel
 Steven Spielberg Jewish Film Archive
 Yad Yaari, Givat Haviva, Kibbutz Artzi

See also 
 List of archives
 List of libraries in Israel
 List of museums in Israel
 Culture of Israel

External links 

Archives in Israel
Israel
Archives
Archives